BCOV may refer to:

 Betacoronavirus (β-CoV), a virus
 Bovine coronavirus (BCoV), a virus
 Brightcove, an American company, stock ticker: BCOV
 BCOV equations in topological recursion